Andrei Pavlovich Svetlakov (born 6 April 1996) is a Russian professional ice hockey player. He is currently playing with HC CSKA Moscow of the Kontinental Hockey League (KHL). He was selected by the Minnesota Wild, 178th overall, in the 2017 NHL Entry Draft.

Playing career
Svetlakov made his debut playing with Krasnaya Armiya of Junior Hockey League (MHL) when he was only 16 years old. Svetlakov made his Kontinental Hockey League (KHL) debut playing with HC CSKA Moscow during the 2015–16 KHL season.

While in the midst of posting career high offensive totals with CKSA Moscow in the 2022–23 season, on 23 February 2023, his NHL rights were traded by the Wild and acquired by the Boston Bruins as part of a three team trade with the Washington Capitals.

International play

He scored two goals in the final of 2016 World Junior Ice Hockey Championships, with his second goal tying the game with just 6 seconds left in regulation, however team Russia eventually lost the final in overtime, resulting in a silver medal. Svetlakov earned the best player award for that game.

Career statistics

Regular season and playoffs

International

Awards and honors

References

External links

1996 births
Living people
HC CSKA Moscow players
Minnesota Wild draft picks
Russian ice hockey centres
Ice hockey people from Moscow
Ice hockey players at the 2012 Winter Youth Olympics